Jason M. Schmitt (born December 7, 1976) is a journalist, documentary producer, and professor and chair of Communication and Media at Clarkson University. He is a regular contributor to Forbes and The Huffington Post in the fields of higher education and new technology.  Schmitt has interviewed an extensive list of celebrities, politicians, and business leaders such as: Slash, Kid Rock, Roger Daltrey, Wayne Kramer, Dan Gilbert, Alfred Taubman, Geoffrey Fieger, Ted Nugent, Lemmy, Alice Cooper, John Sinclair, and Henry Rollins.  

Schmitt researches how online education is changing global education, open access, and new technology trends.  His research has been presented at Massachusetts Institute of Technology, The American University of Paris, and the University of St. Andrews.

Schmitt was interviewer and  field producer for the documentary Louder Than Love by producer Tony D'Annunzio which is focused on The Grande Ballroom, in Detroit, Michigan.  The documentary won an Emmy Award in June 2016.  

Schmitt created a Michigan college student orientated website: MiGovernor.com which was focused on the 2010 Gubernatorial elections in Michigan. The site had over 30 feature articles submitted by prominent Detroit professionals and had over 3000 unique college users access the site.

Schmitt created Venison for Vitality a nonprofit organization which focuses on re-utilizing venison that is killed in traffic accidents.  Working with the South Eastern Michigan Police Chiefs Association the non profit receives calls from local police stations, dispatches a driver to the carcass, video tapes and assess the damage of the carcass, and upon a clear initial documentation, the driver transports the venison to an approved butcher.  The venison is then donated to local Detroit food pantries to help feed the less fortunate.

Schmitt teaches regularly on social media and online journalism.  

Schmitt presented at Future Midwest 2011 and was regularly covers trends and changes in the music industry at conferences such as Rethink Music Conference by the Berklee Music School and Harvard Business School.

Schmitt was born in Dearborn, Michigan, and attended the University of Michigan-Dearborn (BA), Eastern Michigan University (MA) and Bowling Green State University (Ph.D.). 

Schmitt has been employed at Atlantic Records, Warner/Elektra/Atlantic Records, and he operated an independent recording studio. 

Schmitt was an associate professor and is the director of communication studies and co-director of documentary studies at Green Mountain College in Poultney, Vermont, from 2012 to 2016.

Filmography as Director 
 Paywall: The Business of Scholarship (2018)

References

Schmitt, J. (August 2016) "The Philippines And Other Developing Countries Ramp Up Online Education Culture"

Schmitt, J. (May 2016) "Facebook Schools MOOCs on Engagement"

Schmitt, J. (May 2016) "Mortar is Messy: Online Tech Fills in the Higher Ed Brick Walls"

Schmitt, J. (March 2016) "The Open Data Button Takes on For Profit Academic Paywalls"

Schmitt, J. (March 2016) "Higher Ed Gen Ed Misled?"

Schmitt, J. (January 2016) "Five Career Essentials Not Taught in College"

Schmitt, J. (January 2016) "Hype It Up: How Video Built the New Product Launch"

Schmitt, J. (December 2015) "Why Upper Deck Baseball Cards Taught My Generation to be Timid"
Schmitt, J. (September 2015) "Technology and Topspin: Will Connected Tennis Harness the Crowd?."

Schmitt, J. (May 2015) "#Startups: Low-Tech Pitches Rule the High-Tech World."

Schmitt, J. (March 2015) "Moving Beyond the PDF: The RG Format Leads Scholars Into the Social Age."

Schmitt, J. (December 2014) "Academic Journals: The Most Profitable Obsolete Technology in History."

Schmitt, J. (October 2014) "Communication Studies Rise to Relevance."

Schmitt, J. (September 2014) "#Existence_Error: How I Refreshed the Page."

Schmitt, J. (February 2014) "Diluting Digital Activism."

Schmitt, J. (February 2013) "Job Cred: Social Media Certification Revs the Resume."

Schmitt, J. (January 2013) "Social Media Reels in Job Opportunities."

Schmitt, J. (December 2012) "Amanda Palmer: You Need the Crowd Before the Kick."

Schmitt, J. (October 2012) "Green Mountain College Has Oxen and Morals."

Schmitt, J. (May 2012) “Karmin Holds the Music Business Hostage." The Huffington Post.

Schmitt, J.  (2011, November/December) “Down But Never Out,” (cover article) Elmore
Magazine, 16–23.

Schmitt, J. (July/August 2011) "Back Track." DBusiness, 109.

Schmitt, J. (July 2011) "Detroit Shakes Up the Music Industry." The Huffington Post.

Schmitt, J. (May 2011) "Rethinking the Music Business." The Huffington Post.

Schmitt, J. (March 2011) "What New Technology Firms Can Learn from Detroit Rock and Roll." The Huffington Post.

Schmitt, J. (January 2011) "Quicken Loans Turns Success into a Philosophy." The Huffington Post.

Schmitt, J.(December 2010)"Detroit 2.0 Is It Enough To Get Them To Stay." The Huffington Post.

Schmitt, J. (October 2010) "Tenure is for Wimps: An Untenured Professor (re)Contemplates Life." The Huffington Post.

Schmitt, J. (May 2010) "Download Illegally: It's the Right Thing to Do." The Huffington Post.

Schmitt, J. (June 2010) "Radio Gives Payola a Facelift to Stay Afloat." The Huffington Post.

Schmitt, J. (June 2010) "Droid Does Apps: Verizon Does Us All." The Huffington Post.

Schmitt, J. (June 2010) "Gluten-Free Made Me Smarter." The Huffington Post

Schmitt, J. (2008) Like the Last 30 Years Never Happened: Understanding Detroit Rock Music Through Oral History. Bowling Green State University, Ph.D. Dissertation.]

A write up about Jason Schmitt's Detroit music research in The Grosse Pointe News'' "[http://www.grossepointenews.com/Articles-i-2008-08-21-224767.112112_Doctor_of_rock_and_roll.html Doctor of Rock and Roll,"

Constant, J.B. (March 30, 2010)"Professor Helps Make Documentary About Grande Ballroom." The South End: Wayne State University Press.

Wimberly, S. (January 22, 2008). "Jason Schmitt: A Different Sort of Teacher." The South End:Wayne State University.

External links 
JasonSchmitt.com
Jason Schmitt Huffington Post article database 
Jason Schmitt presentation page Future Midwest 2011

American bloggers
Writers from Detroit
Living people
University of Michigan–Dearborn alumni
Bowling Green State University alumni
Eastern Michigan University alumni
1976 births